Cinthia Kusuma Rani (born 4 November, 1997) is an Indonesian ambassador for the Ministry of Environment and Forestry of Indonesia, TV commercial model and a beauty pageant titleholder who was crowned Miss Earth Indonesia 2019. She represented Indonesia at the Miss Earth 2019 held in Jesse M. Robredo Coliseum, Naga City, Camarines Sur - Philippines on October 26, 2019.

Personal life

Rani was born and raised in Ketapang, West Kalimantan, Indonesia to a Melayu Mother and Melayu-Sunda father. Rani moved to Jakarta for her University studies. She is a young beauty-entrepreneur who is also work with her own Non-governmental organization called Greenish Pioneer, an Environmental Ambassador Organization and Environmentalist in Indonesia.

Rani managed to bring students in the rural area across Borneo island to understand the concern of planting trees and make the best use of everything in the environment. The beauty was one of the favourites since the beginning of the journey. 

She has also been working as a volunteer towards promotion of eco-friendly management for Ministry of Environment and Forestry of Indonesia, where she was chosen as an ambassador. She holds a degree in Communication Studies from the Pancasila University, Jakarta, graduated with Latin honours (summa cum laude).

Pageantry

Puteri Batik Nusantara 2017
Rani started her foray into the world of pageantry began in 2017, at the age of twenty where she joined the television celebrity beauty pageant contest
Puteri Batik Nusantara 2017 representing her home Province West Kalimantan. The finale night was held in Jakarta, where she won the title of Puteri Batik Nusantara 2017 and Miss Congeniality award.

Miss Earth Indonesia 2019
Rani was crowned Miss Earth Indonesia 2019  at the grand finale held in Jakarta Convention Center, Jakarta, Indonesia on August 24, 2019. She bested 29 other delegates to win the national crown. She was crowned by outgoing titleholder Ratu Vashti Annisa of Banten. As Miss Earth Indonesia, Rani will now represent Indonesia in Miss Earth 2019.

Miss Earth 2019
As Miss Earth Indonesia 2019, Rani represented Indonesia at Miss Earth 2019 pageant on October 26, 2019 held in Jesse M. Robredo Coliseum, Naga City, Camarines Sur - the Philippines. where Nguyễn Phương Khánh of Vietnam crowned her successor at the end of the event but Rani failed to secure a placement in the semifinals. During Miss Earth 2019, Rani was part of the AIR group together with more than 26 other candidates.

References

External links 

 

Living people
1996 births
Miss Earth 2019 contestants
Indonesian female models
Indonesian beauty pageant winners
Indonesian Christians
People from Ketapang Regency
People from West Kalimantan
Dayak people
Indonesian people of Chinese descent
Chinese people of Indonesian descent